Stenoptilodes stigmatica is a moth of the family Pterophoridae that is known from Colombia, Ecuador and Venezuela.

Adults are on wing in February, September and October.

External links

stigmatica
Moths described in 1875
Moths of South America
Taxa named by Alois Friedrich Rogenhofer